Sioguí Abajo is a town in the Chiriquí province of Panama.

Sources 
World Gazetteer: Panama – World-Gazetteer.com

Populated places in Chiriquí Province